The Sakhanka and Leninske killings were a mass murder committed by Danil Tsupryk in Sakhanka and Leninske, Novoazovsk Raion, Donetsk in August 2021.

Killings
On the evening of August 12, 2021 in Sakhanka, a group of militants of Russian separatist forces in Donbas drank alcohol. After that, Corporal Danil Tsupryk started behaving inappropriately and started shooting at others. There he shot three civilians. They were his girlfriend and an elderly woman and man. He then fled, taking with him an AK-74 assault rifle, four magazines and a hand grenade. He was in camouflage and had a bulletproof vest. A search began for him. On the night of August 12–13, he was surrounded in a two-story building in Leninske by the Donetsk People's Republic (DPR) interior ministry's special response unit. During the assault, he threw a grenade and killed the detachment commander and three soldiers. He was then shot.

Perpetrator
Tsuprik Danil Nikolaevich, 19 was born on February 23, 2002. He served in the 9th Separate Motorized Rifle Regiment of the 1st Army Corps of the DPR. After the killings, the command issued an order to release him from the army on August 9 before the killings.

References

2021 mass shootings in Europe
Donetsk People's Republic
Mass murder in 2021
Mass shootings in Ukraine